Cedarbrae Mall originally had a Zeller's store but no Simpson's, Simpson's was added later, there was a Loblaw's at one end and a Steinberg's at the other

Cedarbrae Mall is a shopping mall in Toronto, Ontario, Canada. It is located at the corner of Markham Road and Lawrence Avenue East in the Scarborough district. It is anchored by No Frills and Canadian Tire.

History

The mall opened in 1962 as a plaza and was anchored by a Woolworth's, a Steinberg's and a Simpsons. Renovations to Cedarbrae Mall would soon replace the original anchors, and bring a Zellers store, as well as additional retail space to the east and west sides of the mall. A No Frills, Canadian Tire, Toys "R" Us, as well as a renovated food court area and both an upper and lower floor were the next few major events for the mall.

In August 1996, the mall was acquired by the Centrefund Realty Corporation. The Canadian portion of Centrefund changed its name to First Capital REIT Corporation in 2001.

In 2012, the Zellers store was acquired by Target, but later sold to Walmart Canada and opened as Walmart in late 2012. A Jysk store also opened around this time, to the west of No Frills, which is not part of the actual mall.

During mid-2013, the mall went through major renovations done by Cinric Construction, which would include the full replacement of the interior and exterior lighting, automatic and energy-efficient washrooms, floor and ceiling finishes, a repaved parking lot, an enhanced food court, and the rebranding of the mall. By late 2013, most of the work was completed, with the exception of final touches such as carpets and mall seating. The food court, named Food Emporium, finished renovations slightly later.

Walmart closed permanently on January 31, 2019. Mall management said the former Walmart store will be filled by new tenants in June 2023.

Incidents
On December 9, 2008, a 21-year-old victim was taken to hospital after he received a knife wound to the neck at around 4:15 pm. The suspect, 21-year-old Jamaal Williams, was arrested and charged with assault with a weapon and aggravated assault. 

On June 3, 2017, Rehab Dughmosh, believed to be wearing an IS (Daesh) bandanna, was arrested after attempting to attack people with a knife outside the Canadian Tire.

See also
 List of shopping malls in Toronto
 List of largest shopping centres in Canada

References

External links
Official site
Cedarbrae Mall at Wikimapia
	First Capital Realty: Property Details for Cedarbrae Mall 

Shopping malls in Toronto
Shopping malls established in 1962
Buildings and structures in Scarborough, Toronto